Alburgh is a village and civil parish in the English county of Norfolk. It lies about four miles (6 km) north-east of Harleston and 16 miles (26 km) south of Norwich.

Heritage
The earliest evidence of settlement is from the Mesolithic era. A Bronze Age barrow near the church was excavated in the 19th century, when bones were removed. Little has been found from the Iron Age, or the Roman or Saxon periods, but there are plentiful medieval remains. The name Alburgh means either "old burial-mound/hill" or "Alda's burial-mound/hill".

Some of the Church of All Saints, Alburgh, dates back to the 13th century. The noted church architect Richard Phipson restored it in 1876, adding "pinnacles with little flying buttresses" and reworking the chancel. Today the church holds a service every Sunday as part of the Earsham benefice. Its ring of eight bells is among Norfolk's oldest. The churchyard is a conservation area.

The former Methodist chapel was turned into a dwelling in the 1960s. The local pub, the Kings Head, closed in 1956.

Homersfield Bridge, which crosses the River Waveney between Alburgh and Homersfield, Suffolk, opened in 1870, making it the oldest surviving concrete bridge in Britain. Homersfield railway station, on the Waveney line and in the parish of Alburgh, opened in 1860 and closed in 1953. Apart from the church and the bridge, there are 17 other Grade II listed buildings in Alburgh, mostly residential.

John Marius Wilson's Imperial Gazetteer of England and Wales wrote in 1870–72: "ALBURGH, a parish in Depwade district, Norfolk; on an affluent of the river Waveney, near the Bungay railway, 3½ miles NNE of Harleston. It has a post office under Harleston, and a fair on 21 June. Acres, 1,512. Real property, £3,699. Pop., 587. Houses, 130. The [landed] property is much subdivided. The living is a rectory in the Diocese of Norwich. Value, £395.* Patron, St. John's College, Cambridge. The church has a large Norman porch. There are [sic] a national school, and charities £240."

Governance
The civil parish with hamlets of Piccadilly Corner and Alburgh Street has an area of 6.42 sq. km. Its 2001 population of 349 in 149 households rose to 410 at the 2011 Census. Its parish council meets monthly. It lies in the district of South Norfolk.

Amenities and firms
Alburgh is on the No. 84 Konectbus service between Norwich and Harleston, which runs in daytime, Monday to Friday. Alburgh with Denton CE VC Primary School has about 100 pupils. Among the regular events at the modern Village Hall are monthly film shows. There are sports clubs for tennis, badminton and carpet bowls.

Alburgh has two general stores, a brewery in Tunbeck Road, an ice cream maker, and garment-printer's.

War Memorial
The Alburgh War Memorial is located in All Saint's Church and holds the names of 19 men who died in the First World War. They are listed as:

 Captain George P. Osborn Springfield (1872-1914), 2nd Dragoon Guards (Queen's Bays)
 Second Lieutenant Humphrey Osborn Springfield (1887-1916), Warwickshire Yeomanry
 Corporal T. Osborn Springfield (d.1916), 1st Troop, Royal Gloucestershire Hussars
 Lance-Corporal H. R. Cower (d.1917)
 Lance-Sergeant William D. Olley (1888-1915), 1st Battalion, Royal Dublin Fusiliers
 Rifleman James E. Hammond (d.1917), 3rd Battalion, Rifle Brigade.
 Rifleman W. Websdale (d.1917), 10th Battalion, King's Royal Rifle Corps
 Private Herbert G. Ray (1898-1917), 5th Battalion, Royal Berkshire Regiment
 Private Harry W. Osborne (1889-1915), 1st Battalion, Essex Regiment
 Private H. M. Reeve (d.1918), 11st Battalion, Royal Fusiliers
 Private Arthur Elmar (d.1915), 1st Battalion, Royal Norfolk Regiment
 Private George C. E. Osborne (d.1917), 1st Battalion, Royal Norfolk Regiment
 Private H. G. Everett (1898-1917), 5th Battalion, Royal Norfolk Regiment
 Private Reginald J. Mitchell (1897-1917), 9th Battalion, Royal Norfolk Regiment
 Private J. E. Love (1893-1917), 6th Battalion, Northamptonshire Regiment
 Private Charles W. Clark (d.1915), 1st Battalion, Sherwood Foresters
 Private Robert Sadler (1896-1917), 7th Battalion, Royal Warwickshire Regiment
 Private Alfred V. Watson (1891-1917), 15th Battalion, Welch Regiment
 Able Seaman Edwin J. Barrett (d.1917), ''Armed trawler Ethel & Millie"

Furthermore, the plaque commemorating the Second World War holds the following names:
 Lance-Corporal Herbert J. Barber (1921-1944), 4th Battalion, Essex Regiment
 Lance-Corporal Edward J. Clarke (1916-1944), 9th Battalion, Parachute Regiment (United Kingdom)
 Private John E. Welch (1916-1944), 10th Battalion, Durham Light Infantry
 Air Mechanic First Class J. H. or C. C. Batchelor (1922-1943), "HMS Dasher (D37)"
 Able Seaman Spencer M. Welch (d.1940), "HMS Whirlwind (D30)""

References

http://kepn.nottingham.ac.uk/map/place/Norfolk/Alburgh

External links

Alburgh, Norfolk village website

South Norfolk
Villages in Norfolk
Civil parishes in Norfolk